Midai is a district in the Natuna Regency, Riau Islands, Indonesia. It is located on the eastern half of Midai island and shares the island with the district of Suak Midai.

Villages 
All 3 villages in Midai rely on wells for their water. There is only one medical facility in Sabang that is an inpatient health center and a pharmacy. All but 5 families use electricity in the district, and they are in Sebelat. There are 4 mosques in the district, with 1 in each village and 2 in Sabang. There are also 13 musallas, 2 in Air Putih, 3 in Sebelat, and 8 in Sabang as well as a  monastery in Sabang. The district is almost exclusively Muslim, with around 1% of people in Sabang being Buddhist and 0.7% of people being Christian. There are 4 lodges in the village of Sabang. The district has one post office in Sabang and the districts postal code is 29784.

Education

References 

 
Populated places in Indonesia
Islands of Indonesia